Olesya Lafina is a 34-year-old Russian Paralympic powerlifter who won the 2014 IPC Powerlifting World Championships which were held in Dubai on 7 April 2014. There, she competed against Lidiia Soloviova of Ukraine and Gihan Abdelaziz of Egypt who won silver and bronze respectively. On May 23 she won a gold medal in Aleksin, Russia for her participation in the IPC Powerlifting Open European Championships.

References

Living people
Russian powerlifters
Paralympic silver medalists for Russia
Powerlifters at the 2012 Summer Paralympics
Medalists at the 2012 Summer Paralympics
Medalists at the 2008 Summer Paralympics
Paralympic powerlifters of Russia
Year of birth missing (living people)
Paralympic medalists in powerlifting